The 2001 UEFA Intertoto Cup finals were won by Aston Villa, Paris Saint-Germain and Troyes. All three teams advanced to the UEFA Cup.

First round

First leg

Second leg

Universitatea Craiova won 4–3 on aggregate.

Hapoel Haifa won 5–0 on aggregate.

Zagłębie Lubin won 4–1 on aggregate.

Celje won 7–2 on aggregate.

Sartid won 5–2 on aggregate.

Lausanne-Sport won 9–1 on aggregate.

2–2 on aggregate. Jazz won on away goals.

Slaven Belupo won 9–0 on aggregate.

AIK won 3–0 on aggregate.

Lokeren won 4–2 on aggregate.

Tiligul Tiraspol won 4–1 on aggregate.

Liepājas Metalurgs won 3–1 on aggregate.

Pobeda won 3–2 on aggregate.

Spartak Varna won 4–1 on aggregate.

2–2 on aggregate. Artmedia Petržalka won 4–3 on penalties.

Tatabánya won 5–4 on aggregate.

2–2 on aggregate. WIT Georgia won on away goals.

Čelik won 6–3 on aggregate.

Dinamo Minsk won 7–1 on aggregate.

Grindavík won 3–1 on aggregate.

Second round

First leg

Tavriya Simferopol were awarded a 3–0 win after Spartak Varna had fielded an ineligible player.

Second leg

Gent won 2–1 on aggregate.

AIK won 4–2 on aggregate.

Paris Saint-Germain won 7–1 on aggregate.

Lausanne-Sport won 4–3 on aggregate.

Heerenveen won 8–4 on aggregate.

Slaven Belupo won 2–0 on aggregate.

Pobeda won 4–1 on aggregate.

1860 Munich won 6–3 on aggregate.

Synot won 5–4 on aggregate.

Tatabánya won 5–1 on aggregate.

Lokeren won 4–3 on aggregate.

Troyes won 7–1 on aggregate.

Basel won 5–0 on aggregate.

Tavriya Simferopol won 5–2 on aggregate.

Celje won 6–1 on aggregate.

Dinamo Minsk won 3–0 on aggregate.

Third round

First leg

Second leg

Newcastle United won 5–0 on aggregate.

Chmel Blšany won 1–0 on aggregate.

Rennes won 7–4 on aggregate.

Aston Villa won 3–2 on aggregate.

1860 Munich won 5–2 on aggregate.

Wolfsburg won 4–3 on aggregate.

3–3 on aggregate. Gent won on away goals.

Brescia won 3–2 on aggregate.

Troyes won 4–2 on aggregate.

Paris Saint-Germain won 5–0 on aggregate.

Basel won 5–3 on aggregate.

1–1 on aggregate. Lausanne-Sport won on away goals.

Semi–finals

First leg

Second leg

2–2 on aggregate. Aston Villa won on away goals.

Paris Saint-Germain won 7–1 on aggregate.

Brescia won 4–3 on aggregate.

Basel won 5–2 on aggregate.

Newcastle United won 6–3 on aggregate.

Troyes won 3–2 on aggregate.

Finals

First leg

Second leg

Aston Villa won 5–2 on aggregate.

1–1 on aggregate. Paris Saint-Germain won on away goals.

4–4 on aggregate. Troyes won on away goals.

Statistics

Top goalscorers

UEFA Cup performance
The three winners (Aston Villa, Paris Saint-Germain and Troyes) entered the competition at the first round, bypassing the qualifying round. The Villa were drawn against Croatian side NK Varteks, but lost 3–2 in the first round at Villa Park. Varteks took the lead through Saša Bjelanović just before half time, but Colombian Juan Pablo Ángel equalised in the second half. Veldin Karić restored the away side's lead just after the hour mark, before Ángel equalised again less than five minutes later. A second from Bjelanović five minutes from time remained unanswered, however. In the second leg at the Stadion Varteks, the only goal came in second half stoppage time, from Moroccan Mustapha Hadji, who brought the Villans level in the tie, but the Croatians still progressed on away goals.

Meanwhile, PSG had been drawn against Rapid București of Romania. The first leg at the Parc des Princes ended goalless, but controversy ensued in the second leg. With scores still level after ninety minutes, the match went to extra time, with les Parisiens taking a lead three minutes into the extra period through Brazilian Aloísio. However, with about five minutes of extra time to play, the lights in the Stadionul Giulești-Valentin Stănescu failed, and the match had to be abandoned. As PSG had been leading at the time, they were awarded the match, and therefore progressed to the next round.

Fellow French team Troyes had a first round tie against MFK Ružomberok of Slovakia. They took a commanding 6–1 victory in the first leg the Stade de l'Aube, including a hat-trick by Samuel Boutal and one goal apiece from Patrice Loko and Algerian Mehdi Méniri. They were also helped by an own goal from Tibor Zátek, while Ruža did manage to get one at the right end through substitute Marián Kurty. The second leg was therefore just a formality, and Ružomberok's 1–0 win, which came thanks to a goal from Tomáš Oravec, was totally meaningless.

Troyes were then drawn against English side Leeds United in the second round, and had to travel away for the first leg to Elland Road. The Whites got a perfect start, taking the lead after just five minutes through Australian Mark Viduka, and Lee Bowyer added a second less than 20 minutes later. However, Troyes hit back, and Loko scored on the half hour mark. In the second half, Viduka and Bowyer added one more each shortly after half time, but Loko's second ten minutes from the end gave Troyes hope for the second leg. When the game at the Stade de l'Aube arrived, it was the French team's turn to have the perfect start, with Moroccan Gharib Amzine striking after eight minutes. Viduka scored his third goal of the tie on the quarter-hour mark, but David Hamed put Troyes back in the lead on the night before half time. Just before the hour mark, Jérôme Rothen levelled the tie at 5–5 on aggregate, but Troyes' two goals at Elland Road meant that they would go through on away goals. However, Irishman Robbie Keane broke French hearts with his goal 12 minutes from time, putting Leeds through 6–5 on aggregate.

PSG, meanwhile, had a much easier first leg against Austrian side Rapid Wien. They won comfortably 4–0 at the Parc des Princes, with two goals from Brazilian Ronaldinho and one apiece for Bernard Mendy and Nicolas Anelka. Die Grün-Weißen put up a little more of a fight at the Gerhard Hanappi Stadium, taking a 2–0 lead thanks to an early brace from Czech forward René Wagner. However, second half goals from Lionel Potillon and, in injury time, Portuguese midfielder Hugo Leal ensured a dominant 6–2 aggregate victory.

PSG were therefore the only remaining Intertoto Cup side in the competition at the third round, where they faced Scottish side Rangers. They played out two 0–0 draws, first at the Ibrox Stadium, then at the Parc des Princes, leaving les Parisiens with the small advantage of taking penalties on home ground. After five penalties apiece, each side had missed two (Nigerian Jay-Jay Okocha and Argentine Gabriel Heinze for PSG, Dutchman Bert Konterman and Heinze's countryman Claudio Caniggia for the Gers). In the sixth round of penalties, Barry Ferguson put the Blues ahead, meaning that a third Argentine, Mauricio Pochettino, had to score to keep his team in the game. However, the centre back's penalty crashed against the crossbar, and PSG were out.

Highest Attendance

Aston Villa's attendance of 39,513 versus Basel at Villa Park on 21 August 2001, represented the highest attendance for any Intertoto fixture that season.

See also
2001–02 UEFA Champions League

References

External links
Official website
2001 UEFA Intertoto Cup at Rec.Sport.Soccer Statistics Foundation

UEFA Intertoto Cup
3